Anees Mokhiber (born July 30, 1992), known mononymously as Anees (stylized in small caps), is an American singer, rapper, and songwriter known for his hit song, "Sun and Moon", becoming the first international artist to top Billboards Philippines Songs chart.

Life and career

1992–2018: Early life 
Anees Mokhiber was born on July 29, 1992, at Washington D.C. He was raised and has resided in Northern Virginia. Anees is biracial, with both Lebanese and Palestinian ancestry. Anees studied at George Mason University, majoring in philosophy and sociology in 2014. His courses became pivotal to his growth as a "deep thinker and conscious lyricist." Being a minority, Anees felt accessibility and opportunity in the school, "falling in love with my time on campus, whether it was going to office hours or walking around campus during sunset." He worked as a pizza delivery man to save up for his studies. While attending summer camp, Anees performed bomber freestyling: "You would, on the fly, come up with a four-bar rhyme to go back-and-forth with someone. I always felt very alive doing it."

Anees attained a Juris Doctor degree in 2017 from the same institution before deciding to pursue a music career. He entered a state of depression, confiding to freestyling as his therapy. His degree allowed him "to maneuver business dealings and the legal side of the music business without being taken advantage of as an independent artist," attesting how his legal acumen became significant to his growth. His Ford Focus became his personal practice space and recording studio, developing his sounds and styles.

2019–2021: Breakthrough and Slip 
Anees posted an early version of "Drunk on Myself" on Instagram in 2019, showing off his flow and rap style publicly. A year later, he uploaded a snippet of his first composition for "Slip" to TikTok.

On April 14, 2020, Anees made his official debut single with "Neverland Fly", a rap song opening up about his battle with depression and the volatility of mental health. On June 21, he collaborated with Arab producer Thanks Joey and Puerto Rican producer El Bles on the high-octane track "Brown Kid", envisioning it as an anthem for minorities. The following month, he released the song "Maybe" and continued to upload snippets of his upcoming work to promote his brand.

"Slip" made its public release as Anees' next single on April 1, 2021, across music platforms, a love song he dedicated to his wife and his vulnerability. While performing the song on his Instagram Live on April 10, Canadian artist Justin Bieber joined his livestream, increasing his viewership to a total of 60,000 people. Bieber praised his musicality and started an open discussion with Anees, lasting for 45 minutes that resulted to an uptick in his Instagram following to 10,000 followers within the hour. The encounter garnered positive press, especially from the Arab community of musicians, including Narcy, Massari, and Big Hass.

The success of "Slip" led to the overlapping release of the songs "Love Is Crazy", a romantic track requested by his fans, and "Drunk on Myself", an ode to self-love. He also published a performance video for "What Lovers Do", an emotive and provocative rap track that featured his signature flow.

2021–present: Sun and Moon 

In November 2021, Anees previewed the chorus of "Sun and Moon" to his social media accounts to positive response, leaning into R&B and a departure from his rap sound. He released "Too Good to Be True" featuring Kevin Spears as a follow-up to this new style, with Spears producing both tracks. Anees continued to preview snippets of the track before being released officially to streaming platforms on April 6, 2022, and confirming it as his lead single for his debut album, Summer Camp.

To promote the song, Anees launched an open verse challenge on TikTok upon its official release. On April 11, former Ex Battalion member JRoa uploaded his version to the site, gaining massive popularity locally, reaching 14 million plays as of May 2022. Anees reached out to JRoa to record a full duet to the song, releasing the official "Sun and Moon" remix on April 14 with an accompanying live performance video of both acts performing from different locations. "Sun and Moon" rose to number-one on the Billboard Philippines Songs chart dated May 7, making it the first English song to reach the summit and Anees as the first international artist to top the list. As of May 2022, the track has gained 20 million streams on Spotify and 5 million views on its music video on YouTube, becoming Anees' most streamed song.

Artistry and influences 
Anees described his sound as genre-defying, ranging from hip-hop, pop, rock, R&B, and soul. He cites Eminem, J. Cole, Immortal Technique, and Kanye West as his main musical inspirations, as well as Lebanese-American poet Kahlil Gibran as his reference for his writing style. Among the Arab community, he listed Omar Offendum, Narcy, and DAM as his influences. His other influences include Chance the Rapper, King Los, John Mayer, India Arie, and Marlon Craft.

Discography

Singles

References 

Living people
1992 births
Lebanese musicians
Palestinian musicians
Musicians from Washington, D.C.
Arab musicians